Prior to the amendment of Tamil Nadu Entertainments Tax Act 1939 on 22 July 2006, Gross was 115 per cent of Nett for all films. Post-amendment, Gross equalled Nett for films with pure Tamil titles. Commercial Taxes Department disclosed 16.35 crore in entertainment tax revenue for the year.

A list of films produced and released in the Tamil film industry in India in 2007 by release date:

List of Tamil films

January—March

April—June

July—September

October—December

The following films also released in 2007, though the release date remains unknown.

Awards

References 

2007
2007 in Indian cinema
Lists of 2007 films by country or language
2000s Tamil-language films